Lepidodactylus buleli is a species of gecko, a lizard in the family Gekkonidae. The species is endemic to Espiritu Santo, an island in the Vanuatu Archipelago.

Discovery
Researchers from France's National Museum of Natural History, recovered nine eggs during an expedition to the region in 2006. One of the eggs yielded a live hatchling which was determined to be of a previously unknown species.

Etymology
The specific name, buleli, refers to a "personal and private story" of the binomial authority.

Habitat
The preferred natural habitat of L. buleli is forest, at altitudes above .

Reproduction
L. buleli is oviparous.

References

Further reading
Ineich, Ivan (2008). "A new arboreal Lepidodactylus (Reptilia: Gekkonidae) from Espiritu Santo Island, Vanuatu: from egg to holotype". Zootaxa 1918: 26–38. (Lepidodactylus buleli, new species).

Lepidodactylus
Endemic fauna of Vanuatu
Reptiles of Vanuatu
Reptiles described in 2006
Taxa named by Ivan Ineich